Dasycnemia rufofascialis is a species of snout moth in the genus Dasycnemia. It was described by Hahn William Capps in 1952 and is known from Mexico.

References

Moths described in 1952
Chrysauginae